The 2017 BYU Cougars women's volleyball team represented Brigham Young University in the 2017 NCAA Division I women's volleyball season. The Cougars were led by third year head coach Heather Olmstead and played their home games at the Smith Fieldhouse. The Cougars were members of the WCC.

BYU came off a season where they won the WCC regular season championship and once again participated in the NCAA tournament before falling to Texas in the third round.

Season highlights
Season highlights will be filled in as the season progresses.

Roster

Schedule

 *-Indicates Conference Opponent
 y-Indicates NCAA Playoffs
 Times listed are Mountain Time Zone.

Announcers for televised games
All home games will be on BYUtv or TheW.tv powered by Stadium. Select road games will also be televised or streamed.

St. Louis: Mitchell Marshall
UTRGV: Mitchell Marshall & Hannah Robison
Ohio State: Spencer Linton, Kristen Kozlowski, & Jason Shepherd
Boise State: Don Marchand
Missouri: Don Marchand
Sacramento State: Don Marchand
Hawai'i: Kanoa Leahey, Chris McLaughlin, & Scott Robbs
Utah: Thad Anderson & Amy Gant (P12); Mitchell Marshall (BYU Radio)
Weber State: Spencer Linton & Amy Gant
Utah Valley: Matthew Baiamonte & Kyle Bruderer
Santa Clara: Anthony Passarelli
San Francisco: Pat Olson
Pepperdine: Spencer Linton, Steve Vail, & Jason Shepherd
San Diego: Darren Preston
Saint Mary's: Alex Jensen
Pacific: Paul Muyskens
Portland: Spencer Linton, Kristen Kozlowski, & Jason Shepherd
Gonzaga: Robbie Bullough
Pepperdine: Al Epstein
Loyola Marymount: Dalton Green
San Diego: Spencer Linton, Kristen Kozlowski, & Jason Shepherd
Pacific: Spencer Linton, Kristen Kozlowski, & Jason Shepherd
Saint Mary's: Spencer Linton, Kristen Kozlowski, & Jason Shepherd
Gonzaga: No commentary
Portland: No commentary
San Francisco: Spencer Linton, Kristen Kozlowski, & Jason Shepherd
Santa Clara: Robbie Bullough & Amy Boswell Usevitch
Loyola Marymount: Robbie Bullough
American: Spencer Linton, Kristen Kozlowski, & Jason Shepherd
Oregon State: Spencer Linton, Kristen Kozlowski, & Jason Shepherd
Kentucky:Tiffany Greene & Missy Whittimore

References
For information on BYU's other fall and winter sports please check out the following:

2017 team
2017 in sports in Utah
BYU